The 2011 Saint Xavier Cougars football team was an American football team that represented Saint Xavier University as a member of the Mideast League of the Mid-States Football Association (MSFA) during the 2011 NAIA football season. In their 13th season under head coach Mike Feminis, the Cougars compiled a 14–1 record and won the NAIA national championship, defeating , 24–20, in the NAIA National Championship Game.

The team ran a no-huddle spread offense that led the NAIA with an average of 45.9 points per game. The national championship was the first for a Chicago college team in nearly a century (dating to the 1913 Chicago Maroons football team).

Key players included quarterback Jimmy Coy, running back Nick Pesek, kicker Tom Lynch (two-time winner of the Fred Mitchell Outstanding Place Kicker Award), and brothers Ryan Fejedelem (linebacker) and Clayton Fejedelem (safety).

The Saint Xavier football program was established 18 years earlier in 1993. Coach Feminis played linebacker on the first Saint Francis team. The entire athletic budget for Saint Francis was $3.9 million with 24 scholarships shared among 88 players.

Schedule

References

Saint Xavier Cougars
Saint Xavier Cougars football seasons
NAIA Football National Champions
Saint Xavier Cougars football